Russkoye Baybakovo (Urıś-Baybaq; , Ruš Bajbak) is a rural locality (a village) in Kameyevsky Selsoviet, Mishkinsky District, Bashkortostan, Russia. The population was 107 as of 2010. There are 2 streets.

Geography 
Russkoye Baybakovo is located 15 km southeast of Mishkino (the district's administrative centre) by road. Bash-Baybakovo is the nearest rural locality.

References 

Rural localities in Mishkinsky District